Metro Manila, the most populous metropolitan area in the Philippines, the seat of government and also the National Capital Region, is home to the tallest skyscrapers in the country. Prominent areas where skyscrapers stand are the Makati Central Business District and Makati Poblacion in Makati; Ortigas Center in Pasig–Mandaluyong–Quezon City; Bonifacio Global City in Taguig; Ermita, Malate and Binondo in the City of Manila; Eastwood City and Araneta City in Quezon City; Robinsons Cybergate in Mandaluyong; and Alabang in Muntinlupa.

The history of highrise buildings in Manila probably began with the construction of the eight-storey Manila Hotel in 1912, which is considered the first modern high-rise building in the Philippines. The constructions of high-rise buildings also shifted from the City of Manila to its surrounding area, including the transformation of Makati into the country's financial and business center in the 1960s.

The first skyscraper (150 meters and above) in the metropolis is the 44-storey Pacific Plaza Condominium, which was completed in 1992.

Tallest completed buildings

This list ranks the highest completed skyscrapers and buildings in Metro Manila — the National Capital Region of the Philippines as of July 2022. The list has a minimum height limit because there is a large number of highrises below that in Metro Manila and the term skyscraper usually refers to buildings as tall and taller.

An equal sign (=) following a rank indicates the same height between two or more structures, and the "Year" column indicates the year in which it was completed. Some authoritative sources are The Skyscraper Center and Emporis.

The number of skyscrapers in the cities of the national capital district as of June 2022:
 Makati – 75
 Taguig – 40
 Mandaluyong – 32
 Manila – 22
 Quezon City – 22
 Pasig – 20
 San Juan – 4

As of September 2022, there are 215 buildings in the list below.

 Was the tallest building in the Philippines upon completion

Not included in the list are buildings which have heights that are only estimated based on floor counts. There are over 70 completed buildings falling under this category, some of which include One Eastwood Avenue Towers 1 and 2 (≈160 m and ≈188 m), West Tower at One Serendra (≈170–191 m), The BeauFort East and West Towers (≈161 m and ≈164 m), Acqua Private Residences Iguazu (≈207 m), Livingstone (≈196 m), Dettifoss (≈170 m), Sutherland (≈163 m), and Niagara (≈155 m) Towers, and The Infinity Fort Bonifacio (≈183–187 m).

Buildings which almost qualify are One McKinley Place (149 m) in Bonifacio Global City, Mandarin Square (149 m) in Binondo, and 8 Wack Wack Road (147 m) in Mandaluyong.

Skyline

Tallest completed twin buildings 
Twin towers refer to identical structure buildings including condominiums, apartments, offices and hotels. This list overlaps with the first list above but also includes those taller than 100 m. Ortigas Center's One Shangri-La Place Twin Towers is one of the top 20 tallest twin buildings in the world.

Tallest under construction or proposed

As of mid 2022, this lists more than 40 highrise and supertall buildings under construction or preparation that are expected to rise  or more in Metro Manila.

The Philippine Diamond Tower, estimated to have a height of 612 m and finished by 2019, is a broadcast tower, not a residential or commercial building (but was cancelled due to unknown reasons). Skycity, estimated to have a height of 335 m but troubled by a lawsuit, only has had excavation work done and has been on-hold with no construction progress since 2005.

Topping out (or topping off) is when the last beam (or its equivalent) is placed atop a structure. For convenience, the entries of the sortable table is arranged alphabetically.

The tallest entry in the table is The Stratford Residences at 312 meters.

Tallest planned or proposed 
These are the tallest planned buildings for Metro Manila that are almost 200 meters or taller but do not yet have a proposed completion year.

Timeline of tallest buildings

This lists buildings that once held the title of tallest building in the Philippines. Other buildings such as churches with tall spires may be taller but are not listed because there are no data available from the time Manila had its first building.

See also
 List of cities with the most skyscrapers
 Tallest buildings in the Philippines

References

 
Metro Manila

es:Anexo:Rascacielos en Filipinas